The 4th Yeşilçam Awards, presented by the Turkish Foundation of Cinema and Audiovisual Culture (TÜRSAK) and Beyoğlu Municipality, honored the best Turkish films of 2010 and took place at the conclusion of the 4th Yeşilçam Week festival on , at the Lütfi Kırdar Congress and Exhibition Hall in Istanbul, Turkey.

The 4th Yeşilçam Week, which will run from March 21 to 28, 2011, will include cinema screenings of classic Turkish films at the Turabibaba Library in Beyoğlu, a concert of Turkish film songs by the band Türk Kahvesi at the Beyoğlu Municipality Youth Culture Center on March 24, an exhibition of portrait photographs by Reza Hemmatirad of filmmaker Osman Sınav at the Beyoğlu Municipal Art Gallery, an exhibition of winning photographs photography from the "Cinemascope Beyoğlu" competition at the Youth Culture Center, and concluded with the awards presentation.

Awards and nominations
A committee of 800 people, including industry representatives, chose five nominees in each of the 13 categories, which include the two new categories of Best Art Director and Best Editor. A second committee of nearly 3,000 people selected winners from among the nominees. The best film won 250,000 TL, while the winners of the Best First Film and the Best Director awards received 50,000 TL.

Best Film
 Winner: Majority produced by Önder Çakar, Sevil Demirci & Seren Yüce
 Hunting Season produced by Yavuz Turgul & Murat Akdilek
 Eyyvah Eyvah produced by Necati Akpinar
 The Crossing produced by Türker Korkmaz
 Cosmos produced by Ömer Atay
 Yahşi Batı produced by Murat Akdilek & Cem Yılmaz

Best Director
 Winner: Reha Erdem for Cosmos
 Ömer Faruk Sorak for Yahşi Batı
 Selim Demirdelen for The Crossing
 Seren Yüce for Majority
 Yavuz Turgul for Hunting Season

Best Actress
 Winner: Demet Akbağ for Eyyvah Eyvah
 Demet Evgar for Yahşi Batı
 Esme Madra for Majority
 Sevinç Erbulak for Sleeping Princess
 Türkü Turan for Cosmos

Best Actor
 Winner: Cem Yılmaz for Hunting Season
 Bartu Küçükçağlayan for Majority
 Güven Kıraç for The Crossing
  for Cosmos
 Tansu Biçer for Five Cities

Best Supporting Actor
 Winner: Okan Yalabık for Hunting Season
 Bülent Emin Yarar for Five Cities
 Çetin Tekindor for Hunting Season
 Salih Kalyon for Eyyvah Eyvah
 Zafer Algöz for Yahşi Batı

Best Supporting Actress
 Winner: Melisa Sözen for Hunting Season
 Nihal Koldaş for Majority
 Özge Özpirinççi for Veda
 Selen Uçer for A Step into the Darkness
 Şebnem Sönmez for Five Cities

Best Cinematogropher
 Winner: Uğur İçbak for Hunting Season
 Barış Özbiçer for Majority
 Florent Herry for Cosmos
 Mirsad Herović for Yahşi Batı
 Türksoy Gölebeyi for The Voice

Best Editor
 Winner: Reha Erdem for Cosmos
 Çağrı Türkan for Yahşi Batı
 Çiçek Kahraman & Natalin Solakoğlu for The Voice
 Mary Stephen for Majority
 Selim Demirdelen for The Crossing

Best Art Director
 Winner: Hakan Yarkın for Yahşi Batı
 Hakan Yarkın for Veda
 Meral Efe for Majority
 Ömer Atay for Cosmos
 Sırma Bradley for Hunting Season

Best Screenplay
 Winner: Seren Yüce for Majority
 Ata Demirer for Eyyvah Eyvah
 Onur Ünlü for Five Cities
 Reha Erdem for Cosmos
 Selim Demirdelen for The Crossing
 Yavuz Turgul for Hunting Season

Best Music
 Winner: Selim Demirdelen for The Crossing
 Fahir Atakoğlu & Serkan Çağrı for Eyyvah Eyvah
 Redd for Sleeping Princess
 Tamer Çıray for Hunting Season
 Zülfü Livaneli for Veda

Best Young Talent Award
 Winner: Esme Madra for Majority
 Büşra Pekin for Çok Filim Hareketler Bunlar
 Damla Sönmez for Mahpeyker: Kösem Sultan
 Şenay Orak for Min Dît: The Children of Diyarbakır
 Umut Kurt for The Crossing

Turkcell First Film Award
 Winner: Seren Yüce for Majority
 Erhan Kozan for The Jackal
 Ozan Açıktan for Çok Filim Hareketler Bunlar
 Selim Demirdelen for The Crossing
 Aslı Özge for Men on the Bridge
 Ketche for Romantic Comedy

Service to Culture and Art Award
 Nebahat Çehre (Turkish actress)
 Göksel Arsoy (Turkish actor)
 İzzet Günay (Turkish actor)

Yeşilçam Pride of Performance Award
 Türker İnanoğlu (Turkish screenwriter, film director and producer)

See also
 43rd SİYAD Awards
 Turkish films of 2010
 2010 in film

External links
  for the awards (Turkish)

References

2011 in Turkey
2010 film awards
Yeşilçam Award
2011 in Istanbul